Below is a partial list of minor league baseball players in the Miami Marlins system:

Players

Jacob Amaya 

Jacob Carlos Amaya (born September 3, 1998) is an American professional baseball Shortstop in the Miami Marlins organization.

Amaya was drafted by the Los Angeles Dodgers in the 11th round of the 2017 MLB Draft out of South Hills High School in West Covina, California. He made his debut with the Arizona League Dodgers in 2017, hitting .254 in 34 games. He split the 2018 season between the Ogden Raptors and Great Lakes Loons, hitting .311 in 59 games. He spent 103 games with the Loons in 2019 before a promotion to the Rancho Cucamonga Quakes for 21 games. Overall he hit .260. After missing the 2020 season due to the cancellation of minor league baseball because of the COVID-19 pandemic, he played in 113 games with the Tulsa Drillers in 2021, hitting .216. He was assigned to the Glendale Desert Dogs of the Arizona Fall League after the season and then added to the Dodgers 40-man roster. His season was split between the Drillers and the Triple-A Oklahoma City Dodgers. He hit a combined .261 in 133 games with 17 homers and 71 RBIs.

On January 11, 2023, Amaya was traded to the Miami Marlins in exchange for Miguel Rojas. Amaya was optioned to the Triple-A Jacksonville Jumbo Shrimp to begin the 2023 season.

Griffin Conine

Griffin Riley Conine (born July 11, 1997) is an American professional baseball outfielder in the Miami Marlins organization. He is son of former Major League Baseball (MLB) outfielder Jeff Conine.

Conine attended Pine Crest High School in Fort Lauderdale, Florida. In his senior season, he recorded a .341 batting average with eight home runs and 27 runs batted in (RBI). He was selected in the 31st round of the 2015 Major League Baseball draft by the Miami Marlins, but did not sign, and attended Duke University. In his first season for the Blue Devils, Conine appeared in 35 games and hit .205 with six RBI. As a sophomore, he batted .298 with 13 home runs and 56 RBI. He became the first Blue Devil to total 50-plus RBI in a season since Nate Freiman (62) in 2009, and with 13 home runs, was the first Duke player with 10 or more in a season since Jake Lemmerman (10) in 2010. In his third and final season with Duke, Conine played in 63 games and hit .286 with 18 home runs and 52 RBI. In 2017, he played collegiate summer baseball with the Cotuit Kettleers of the Cape Cod Baseball League, and was named a league all-star and the league's Outstanding Pro Prospect.

Conine was selected by the Toronto Blue Jays in the second round of the 2018 Major League Baseball draft, and signed on June 20 for a $1.35 million signing bonus. He was assigned to the Rookie-level Gulf Coast Blue Jays and appeared in two games before being promoted to the Short Season-A Vancouver Canadians. Conine finished the season with a .243 batting average, seven home runs, and 33 RBI in 57 games. On November 19, 2018, Conine was suspended for fifty games after testing positive for a banned stimulant. He spent the 2019 season with the Lansing Lugnuts, slashing .283/.371/.576 with 22 home runs and 64 RBIs over eighty games.

Conine was traded to the Marlins as the player to be named later in the Jonathan Villar trade that occurred on August 31, 2020. He did not play a minor league game in 2020 due to the cancellation of the minor league season caused by the COVID-19 pandemic.

Jake Eder

Jacob Andrew Eder (born October 9, 1998) is an American professional baseball pitcher in the Miami Marlins organization.

Eder attended Atlantic Community High School in Delray Beach, Florida as a freshman, sophomore, and junior before transferring to Calvary Christian Academy in Fort Lauderdale, Florida, for his senior year. In 2017, his senior baseball season, he went 8–1 with a 1.25 ERA and 81 strikeouts. He was selected by the New York Mets in the 34th round of the 2017 Major League Baseball draft, but did not sign, and instead chose to fulfill his commitment to play college baseball at Vanderbilt University.

In 2018, Eder's freshman year at Vanderbilt, he appeared in 11 games (nine starts), going 1–4 with a 5.45 ERA over 33 innings. As a sophomore in 2019, he pitched  innings in relief, compiling a 1–0 record, a 2.88 ERA, and 37 strikeouts. He pitched the last three innings of the third game of the 2019 College World Series, clinching Vanderbilt's second national title. Following the end of the college baseball season, he played in the Cape Cod Baseball League for the Orleans Firebirds. For his junior year in 2020, he pitched to a 1–1 record and a 3.60 ERA over four starts before the college baseball season was cut short due to the COVID-19 pandemic.

Eder was selected by the Miami Marlins in the fourth round of the 2020 Major League Baseball draft with the 104th overall pick and signed. He did not play a minor league game in 2020 due to the cancellation of the minor league season caused by the pandemic. To begin the 2021 season, he was assigned to the Pensacola Blue Wahoos of the Double-A South. In July, he was selected to play in the All-Star Futures Game at Coors Field as an injury replacement. In mid-August, he was placed on the injured list, and later that same month, it was announced that he would undergo Tommy John surgery, forcing him to miss the remainder of the 2021 season and all of 2022. Over 15 starts for the 2021 season, Eder went 3–5 with a 1.77 ERA, striking out 99 batters over  innings.

Vanderbilt Commodores bio

Nic Enright

Nicholas Crispen Enright (born January 8, 1997) is an American professional baseball pitcher for the Miami Marlins of Major League Baseball (MLB).

Enright attended The Steward School in Richmond, Virginia. As a senior in 2015, he was the Gatorade Baseball Player of the Year for Virginia. He was drafted by the New York Mets in the 19th round of the 2015 Major League Baseball draft, but did not sign and played college baseball at Virginia Tech. In 2018, he briefly played collegiate summer baseball with the Cotuit Kettleers of the Cape Cod Baseball League. Enright was drafted by the Cleveland Indians in the 20th round of the 2019 MLB draft, and signed.

Enright made his professional debut with the Arizona League Indians. He did not play for a team in 2020 due to the Minor League Baseball season cancelled because of the Covid-19 pandemic. He returned in 2021 to play for the Lake County Captains and Akron RubberDucks. Enright started 2022 with Akron before being promoted to the Columbus Clippers.

On December 7, 2022, Enright was selected by the Miami Marlins in the 2022 Rule 5 draft, adding him to their 40-man roster.

On February 13, 2023, Enright announced that he was diagnosed with Hodgkin’s lymphoma in December, and had already completed his first round of treatments.

Dax Fulton

Daxton James Fulton (born October 16, 2001) is an American professional baseball pitcher for the Miami Marlins organization.

Fulton went to Mustang High School in Harris County, Texas, where he played baseball. He hit to a .427 batting average in his junior season. He tore a ligament in his pitching elbow at the end of his junior season of high school and opted to undergo Tommy John surgery, which made him miss his senior season. He committed to Vanderbilt to play college baseball on September 22, 2017, but he flipped his commitment to Oklahoma on October 3, 2019. Fulton was drafted in the second round with the 40th overall pick in the 2019 Major League Baseball draft.

Fulton signed for a $2.4 million signing bonus on July 20, 2020. He did not play a minor league game in 2020 due to the cancellation of the minor league season caused by the COVID-19 pandemic. He made his professional debut in 2021 with the Jupiter Hammerheads and the Beloit Sky Carp, appearing in twenty games (19 starts) and going 2–5 with a 4.60 ERA and 84 strikeouts over  innings. He opened the 2022 season back with Beloit.

C.J. Hinojosa

Christopher Jesse Hinojosa (born July 15, 1994) is an American baseball infielder in the Miami Marlins organization.

Hinojosa was born in Houston, Texas and attended Klein Collins High School. He was selected in the 26th round of the 2012 Major League Baseball draft by the Houston Astros, but did not sign with the team. Hinojosa played college baseball for the Texas Longhorns and was a starter for three seasons. In 2013 and 2014, he played collegiate summer baseball with the Harwich Mariners of the Cape Cod Baseball League.

Hinojosa was selected in the 11th round of the 2015 MLB Draft by the San Francisco Giants. After signing with the team, he was assigned to the Salem-Keizer Volcanoes of the Class A Short Season Northwest League. Hinojosa started the 2016 season with the Class A-Advanced San Jose Giants, where he batted .296 in 69 games before being promoted to the Double-A Richmond Flying Squirrels. He hit .248 with Richmond before suffering a ruptured Achilles tendon in the final series of the season. Hinojosa was suspended for the first 50 games of the 2018 season after testing positive for a non-performance enhancing drug for a second time. He returned to Richmond and finished the season with a .261 average with three home runs and 26 RBIs in 67 games played.

Hinojosa was traded to the Milwaukee Brewers in exchange for Erik Kratz on March 25, 2019. He was assigned to the Biloxi Shuckers of the Southern League. Hinojosa batted .280 during the regular season and slashed .400/.393/.800 with four doubles, two home runs and nine RBIs in the Southern League Playoffs. He was transferred to the Triple-A San Antonio Missions at the end of the season. He was released by the Brewers on June 4, 2020.

After the 2020 minor league season was canceled, Hinojosa played in the temporary independent Constellation Energy League for the Sugar Land Lightning Sloths. He was signed by the Houston Astros to a minor league contract on January 25, 2021. Hinojosa spent the 2021 season with the  Triple-A Sugar Land Skeeters and batted .316 with 11 home runs and 67 RBIs in 107 games played.

Hinojosa became a free agent at the end of the season and later signed a minor league contract with the San Diego Padres on December 16, 2021. Hinojosa was named to the Padres' 2022 spring training roster as a non-roster invitee. He elected free agency on November 10, 2022.

On December 15, 2022, Hinojosa signed a minor league contract with the Marlins.

Texas Longhorns bio

Troy Johnston

Troy Michael Johnston (born June 22, 1997) is an American professional baseball first baseman in the Miami Marlins organization.

Johnston attended Governor John R. Rogers High School in Puyallup, Washington and played college baseball at Gonzaga University He was drafted by the Miami Marlins in the 17th round of the 2019 Major League Baseball Draft. He made his professional debut with the Batavia Muckdogs.

Johnston did not play a minor league game in 2020 due to the cancellation of the minor league season caused by the COVID-19 pandemic. He returned to play for the Jupiter Hammerheads and Beloit Snappers in 2021. After the season, he played in the Arizona Fall League. Johnston started 2022 with the Pensacola Blue Wahoos.

Zach King

Zach King (born April 30, 1998) is an American professional baseball pitcher in the Miami Marlins organization.

King played college baseball for the Vanderbilt Commodores for three seasons. He was primarily used as a relief pitcher. As a sophomore, King made 21 appearances with three starts and posted a 1-4 record with a 3.46 ERA and 51 strikeouts in 52 innings pitched. In 2018, he played collegiate summer baseball with the Chatham Anglers of the Cape Cod Baseball League.

King was selected in the 13th round of the 2019 Major League Baseball draft by the Miami Marlins. After signing with the team he was assigned to the Gulf Coast League Marlins, where he had a 1.65 ERA with 17 strikeouts in  innings pitched. He did not play a minor league game in 2020 due to the cancellation of the minor league season caused by the COVID-19 pandemic. King spent the 2021 season with the High-A Beloit Snappers. He returned to Beloit, now named the Sky Carp, to begin the 2022 season.

Vanderbilt Commodores bio

Zach McCambley

Zachary Tyler McCambley (born May 4, 1999) is an American professional baseball pitcher in the Miami Marlins organization.

McCambley attended Pocono Mountain East High School in Swiftwater, Pennsylvania, where he went 6–1 with a 1.70 ERA and ninety strikeouts as a senior in 2017. Unselected in the 2017 Major League Baseball draft, he enrolled at Coastal Carolina University where he played college baseball.

As a freshman at Coastal Carolina in 2018, McCambley went 3–0 with a 3.14 ERA over 18 games, striking out fifty batters over  innings. In 2019, he appeared in 22 games (11 starts), going 6–3 with a 5.21 ERA, 76 strikeouts, and 27 walks over  innings. He played in the Cape Cod Baseball League for the Cotuit Kettleers that summer, posting a 1.74 ERA over  innings. In 2020, McCambley pitched 25 innings in which he went 3–1 with a 1.80 ERA and 32 strikeouts before the season was cancelled due to the COVID-19 pandemic. He was selected by the Miami Marlins in the third round of the 2020 Major League Baseball draft.

McCambley signed with Miami and made his professional debut in 2021 with the Beloit Snappers of the High-A Central. He was promoted to the Pensacola Blue Wahoos of the Double-A South in early July. Over twenty starts between the two clubs, McCambley pitched to a 3–10 record, a 4.36 ERA, 120 strikeouts, and 26 walks over 97 innings. He returned to Pensacola for the 2022 season. Over 19 starts, he went 6-8 with a 5.65 ERA and 101 strikeouts over 94 innings.

Coastal Carolina bio

Víctor Mesa Jr.

Víctor Mesa Jr. (born September 8, 2001) is a Cuban professional baseball outfielder in the Miami Marlins organization.

Mesa is the son of Víctor Mesa and the younger brother of Víctor Víctor Mesa. Mesa and his brother defected from Cuba in 2018. After they were declared free agents, both Mesa brothers signed with the Marlins on October 22. Mesa received a $1 million signing bonus.

Mesa made his professional debut in 2019 with the Gulf Coast League Marlins, batting .284/.366/.398 with one home run, 24 RBIs, and seven stolen bases over 47 games.

Nasim Nunez 

Nasim Emmanuel Nunez (born August 18, 2000) is an American professional baseball infielder in the Miami Marlins organization.

Nunez attended Collins Hill High School in Suwanee, Georgia. He was drafted in the second round with the 46th overall selection in the 2019 Major League Baseball draft by the Miami Marlins. He signed, forgoing his commitment to play college baseball at Clemson University.

After signing, Nunez was assigned to the Gulf Coast League Marlins where he compiled a .211/.354/.251 slash line and 28 stolen bases over 48 games. He did not play any minor league games in 2020 due to the cancellation of the season caused by the COVID-19 pandemic. Nunez began the 2021 season with the Jupiter Hammerheads, batting .243 with ten RBIs and 33 stolen bases over 52 games. He missed time at the end of the season with a leg injury.

Eury Pérez

Eury Rafael Pérez (born April 15, 2003) is a Dominican professional baseball pitcher in the Miami Marlins organization.

Pérez signed with the Miami Marlins as an international free agent in July 2019. He did not play a minor league game in 2020 due to the cancellation of the minor league season caused by the COVID-19 pandemic.

Pérez made his professional debut in 2021 with the Jupiter Hammerheads.

Sean Reynolds

Sean William Reynolds (born Aril 19, 1998) is an American professional baseball pitcher in the Miami Marlins organization.

Reynolds attended Redondo Union High School in Redondo Beach, California. He was drafted by the Miami Marlins in the fourth round of the 2016 Major League Baseball Draft. After spending his first four years as a first baseman and outfielder, he converted into a pitcher in 2021.

The Marlins added him to their 40-man roster after the 2022 season. Reynolds was optioned to the Double-A Pensacola Blue Wahoos to begin the 2023 season.

Josh Simpson

Joshua Wayne Simpson (born August 19, 1997) is an American professional baseball pitcher in the Miami Marlins organization.

Simpson attended Stafford High School in Stafford, Connecticut and played college baseball at Columbia University. He was drafted by the Miami Marlins in the 32nd round of the 2019 Major League Baseball Draft. He spent his first professional season with the Gulf Coast Marlins and Batavia Muckdogs.

Simpson did not play a minor league game in 2020 due to the cancellation of the minor league season caused by the COVID-19 pandemic. He returned to pitch for the Florida Complex League Marlins and Beloit Snappers in 2021. After the season, he played in the Arizona Fall League. Simpson started 2022 with the Pensacola Blue Wahoos. He was added to the 40-man roster after the 2022 season.

George Soriano

George Soriano (born March 24, 1999) is a Dominican professional baseball pitcher in the Miami Marlins organization.

Soriano signed with the Miami Marlins as an insertional free agent in August 2015. He made his professional debut in 2016 with the Dominican Summer League Marlins.

The Marlins added Soriano to their 40-man roster after the 2022 season. Soriano was optioned to the Triple-A Jacksonville Jumbo Shrimp to begin the 2023 season.

Will Stewart

William A. Stewart (born July 14, 1997) is an American professional baseball pitcher in the Miami Marlins organization.

Stewart attended Hazel Green High School in Hazel Green, Alabama. The Philadelphia Phillies selected Stewart in the 20th round, with the 694th overall selection, of the 2015 Major League Baseball draft. He signed with the Phillies, forgoing his commitment to play college baseball at Wallace State Community College.

After signing, Stewart was assigned to the Gulf Coast League Phillies where he went 1–0 with a 4.79 ERA over  relief innings pitched. He returned to the GCL in 2016, pitching to a 2–3 record and 4.06 ERA in 11 games (seven starts), and in 2017, he played with the Williamsport Crosscutters of the Class A Short Season New York-Penn League where he posted a 4–2 record with a 4.18 ERA in 13 starts. In 2018, he pitched for the Lakewood BlueClaws of the Class A South Atlantic League, where he was named a South Atlantic League All-Star. In twenty starts for the season, he pitched to an 8–1 record with a 2.06 ERA and a 0.98 WHIP.

On February 7, 2019, the Phillies traded Stewart, Jorge Alfaro, Sixto Sanchez, and $250,000 of international signing bonus pool money to the Miami Marlins for J. T. Realmuto. He spent the 2019 season with the Jupiter Hammerheads of the Class A-Advanced Florida State League, going 6–12 with a 5.43 ERA over 23 games (21 starts). He did not play a minor league game in 2020 due to the cancellation of the minor league season caused by the COVID-19 pandemic. He spent the 2021 season with the Pensacola Blue Wahoos, going 5–8 with a 4.33 ERA and 85 strikeouts over  innings.

Eli Villalobos

Elijah Daniel Villalobos (born June 26, 1997) is an American professional baseball pitcher in the Miami Marlins organization.

Villalobos played college baseball at California State University, Long Beach. He was drafted by the Miami Marlins in the 14th round of the 2018 Major League Baseball draft.

The Marlins added Villalobos to their 40-man roster after the 2022 season.

Full Triple-A to Rookie League rosters

Triple-A

Double-A

High-A

Single-A

Rookie

Foreign Rookie

References

Miami Marlins lists
Lists of minor league baseball players